Saint Hildegund can refer to
 Hildegund (widow), c.1130 – 1178
 Hildegund (virgin), died 1188